Narciso Clavería may refer to:

 Narciso Clavería y Zaldúa, 1st Count of Manila (1795–1851), Governor-General of the Philippines
 Narciso Clavería y de Palacios, 3rd Count of Manila, Spanish architect